Jon Owens (born December 19, 1973), known by his stage name Casual, is an American rapper, producer, and one of the founding members of the alternative hip hop collective Hieroglyphics. After his debut album Fear Itself garnered both critical and commercial success, Casual went on to become one of the most prominent and recognizable faces on the Hieroglyphics roster, releasing five full-length LPs over the span of his twenty-year career. Despite the lackluster sales of the LPs following his debut, which were preceded by an absence of both critical and popular acclaim, Owens has garnered a following amongst devoted hip hop fans, particularly in the Bay Area hip hop scene, largely due to his specialization in hardcore battle rhymes.

Biography
After high-profile appearances on Del tha Funky Homosapien and Souls of Mischief albums, in 1994 Casual released Fear Itself. The album was the second-highest charting album in Hieroglyphics' history. Casual followed a typical verse-chorus-verse structure but stood out with his ferocious but playful battle lyrics. Casual has been acclaimed for "wielding his metaphors and sinewy delivery with lethal grace"

After the release of Fear Itself, Casual (as well as fellow Hieroglyphics members Souls of Mischief) was dropped from Jive Records. Casual documents the experience in the book, Hip Hop in America: A Regional Guide: Volume 1: East Coast and West Coast:

In 1994, Casual was involved in a high-profile battle with rapper Saafir. The beef originally started when Saafir appeared on Casual's debut album, and Casual did not appear on Saafir's. This ignited the infamous "Hiero vs Hobo Junction" battle, which involved some controversy when rumors surfaced that Saafir was using pre-written raps as opposed to Casual and Hieroglyphics expected freestyling. Despite this, it is regarded as an influential battle in underground hip-hop's history.

Casual has expressed, much like the rest of the Hieroglyphics crew the importance of competition in hip hop, stating "I think that MCing should be a competitive thing, almost like a sport. The only way an MC can keep polishing and sharpening his skills is to test them against the competition and the up and coming young bloods."

Discography

Albums
Fear Itself (1994) #108 Billboard 200
Meanwhile... (1997)
He Think He Raw (2001)
Truck Driver (2004)
Smash Rockwell (2005)
The Hierophant (2011)
He Think He #Rapgod (2011)
He Still Think He Raw (2012)
Respect Game or Expect Flames (2012) (with J. Rawls)
Return of the Backpack (2013)

EPs
Santa Claus (2013)

Singles
"That's How It Is" (1993)
"I Didn't Mean To" (1993)
"Me-O-Mi-O" (1994)
"VIP" (1999)
"Blind Date" (2001)
"Same O.G." (2001)
"We Don't Get Down Like That" (2002)
"My Whole Intent" (2004) (with Fat Jack)
"Rap Game" b/w "Things I Need" (2004)
"Say That Then" b/w "Oaktown (Remix)" (2005)
"Rock My Shit" (2010)
"101% Music" (2010)

Guest appearances
Souls of Mischief - "Limitations" from 93 'til Infinity (1993)
Del the Funky Homosapien - "No More Worries" from No Need for Alarm (1993)
Extra Prolific - "Cash Money" from Like It Should Be (1994)
Kurious - "What's the Real" from A Constipated Monkey (1994)
Kool DJ EQ - "Three Emcees" (1997)
Del the Funky Homosapien - "Checkin Out the Rivalry" from Future Development (1997)
Everlast - "Funky Beat" from Whitey Ford Sings the Blues (1998)
Soul Coughing - "Needle to the Bar" from El Oso (1999)
Del the Funky Homosapien - "Jaw Gymnastics" from Both Sides of the Brain (2000)
T.W.D.Y. - "No Win Situation" from Lead the Way (2000)
Edo G - "Big Business" from The Truth Hurts (2000)
Virtuoso - "All We Know" from World War One: The Voice of Reason (2001)
INXS - "Tight (Dan the Automator Remix)" from The Best of INXS (2002)
Aceyalone - "Let Me Hear Sum'n" from Love & Hate (2003)
Rasco - "San Fran to the Town" from Escape from Alcatraz (2003)
Goapele - "The Daze" from Even Closer (2004)
Handsome Boy Modeling School - "It's Like That" from White People (2004)
Tajai - "Fashion Fetish" from Power Movement (2004)
Lyrics Born - "Callin' Out Remix" from Same !@$ Different Day (2005)
Swollen Members - "Torture" from Black Magic (2006)
Knobody - "Champion" from Tha Clean-Up (2007)
Dilated Peoples - "Hot and Cold (Remix)" from The Release Party (2007)
Sean Price - "Connect 4" from Master P (2007)
Prince Ali - "The Majors" from Curb Side Service (2007)
The Mighty Underdogs - "Laughing at You" from Droppin' Science Fiction (2008)
Mochipet - "Mr. Malase" from Microphonepet (2008)
Jake One - "Feelin' My Shit" from White Van Music (2008)
Virtuoso - "No Fear" from The Final Conflict (2010)
Pro the Leader and Dopestyle - "Triple Threat" and "Money Off Rap" from Hip Hop Depression (2010)
Myka 9 - "Oh Yeah... Alright" from Mykology (2011)
Zion I & The Grouch - "Plead the Fifth" from Heroes in the Healing of the Nation (2011)
J. Rawls - "Find a New" from The Hip-Hop Affect (2011)
DJ Q-Fingaz - "Watch I Spit" from Qllection (2012)
Copywrite - Golden State (of Mind) from God Save the King (2012)
First Light - "Valley of the Kings" and "Lighters" from Fallacy Fantasy (2013)
Cannibal Ox - "Think Differently" from Gotham (2013)
Deltron 3030 - "What Is This Loneliness" from Event 2 (2013)
Planet Asia & Tzarizm - "Via Satellite" from Via Satellite (2014)
The Funk Junkie - "You & Me" from Moondirt (2017)
ReauBeau - "On Fire" (2020)

Chart history

Albums

Singles

References

External links 
Hieroglyphics

1973 births
African-American male rappers
Hieroglyphics (group) members
Living people
Rappers from Oakland, California
Underground rappers
21st-century American rappers
21st-century American male musicians
21st-century African-American musicians
20th-century African-American people